Evgeny Romanov may refer to:
 Evgeny Romanov (chess player) (born 1988), Russian chess grandmaster
 Evgenyi Romanov (born 1985), Russian heavyweight boxer